Image Entertainment Corporation is a Canadian animation production company based in Montreal, Quebec, Canada. the company was founded in 2000 by company president Sylvain Viau and specializes in 2D and 3D animation for international clientele. The company is currently developing a new children's series called Spyworld.

Productions
Martin Mystery (2003–2006) - co-produced by Marathon Media and RAI Fiction
Team Galaxy  (2006–2007) - co-produced with Marathon Media and RAI Fiction
Totally Spies! (Season 3–5) (2004–2008) - co-produced with Marathon Media
Monster Buster Club (2007–2009) - co-produced with Marathon Media and Jetix Europe
The Amazing Spiez! (2009–2012) - co-produced with Marathon Media
Walter and Tandoori (2005–2010) - co-produced with Oasis Entertainment
Toopyrama - Co-produced with Starz Media
Walter's Christmas (2011 film) - co-produced by Alliance Films)

In Development
Spyworld - co-produced Telefilm Canada

References

Canadian animation studios
Studios in Canada